Srinivas Rao Kandula is an Indian business executive, entrepreneur, and Chairman of Capgemini India operations. Prior to his new role, between January 2016 and December 2018, Srinivas Kandula was CEO of Capgemini in India and member of the Executive Committee of the Capgemini Group. He was also a former Member of the Executive Council and head HR in IGATE Corporation, having led their HR, Quality, Marketing and Business Strategy functions globally.

Education
Srini, as he is fondly known, is a doctoral fellow from XLRI Jamshedpur. His doctoral thesis at XLRI was on the topic of ‘Alignment between Corporate Restructuring Strategies and Human Resource Interventions in BT-Top 500 Companies’. The thesis has received critical acclaim which was eventually published by Prentice Hall titled as "Strategic Human Resource Development".

Career
Before becoming the CEO of Capgemini Technology Services India Ltd, Srini held the roles of Chief People Officer, Executive Vice President and Member of the Executive Council successively at IGATE Global Solutions. Since joining in 2007, he was instrumental in driving IGATE’s Business Strategy, Human Resources Management, Quality Management and Marketing functions globally.

Srini is also a well-known cross-border Integration and Transformation specialist of corporate organizations. He has played a key role in Patni acquisition by IGATE and later he was the Head of Integration between IGATE and Patni. Srini also played a pivotal role in the acquisition of IGATE by Capgemini and later was the co-head of integration between Capgemini and IGATE. Both these integrations are known to be extremely successful.

He has previously held senior leadership roles at Power Grid Corporation of India and Sasken Technologies Ltd. Srini is also known to be instrumental in garnering all these companies the recognition of ‘ The Best Employer’ through design and execution of large-scale transformation programmes’.

Publications
He has published over 60 papers and 9 books in the areas of Strategic Human Resource Development, Performance Management, Organization Development and Self-Development, which have been published by international publishers in multiple languages.

See also
Ashok Vemuri 
Satya Nadella

References

External links
Capgemini.com

1968 births
Living people
Businesspeople in software
Telugu people
Indian chief executives
Indian business executives
Businesspeople from Andhra Pradesh
Indian philanthropists
Indian industrialists
XLRI – Xavier School of Management alumni